Pogo, PoGo or POGO may refer to:

Arts, entertainment and media
 Pogo stick, a toy used for jumping up and down with the aid of a spring
 Extreme Pogo, an action sport on specially designed "extreme" pogo sticks
 Pogo ball, a toy similar to a pogo stick, based on a rubber ball

Gaming
 Philippine Offshore Gaming Operator, a designation given to a Philippines-based online gaming company
 Pogo Joe, a video game
 Pogo.com, a website featuring free online games
 Pokémon Go, a mobile video game sometimes abbreviated as "PoGo"

Music
 "Pogo," a song by Digitalism
 Pogo cello, a folk percussion instrument
 Pogo Pops, a pop rock band

Other arts, entertainment and media
 Pogo (comic strip), by Walt Kelly, and its title character
 Pogo (dance), a dance style
 Pogo Plane, a fictional airplane
 Pogo (TV channel), an Indian cable television channel

Organizations
 Anarchist Pogo Party of Germany
 Partnership for Observation of the Global Oceans, an oceanography organization
 Project On Government Oversight, US anti-corruption organization
 Pogo Structures, a French boat building company

People
 Pogo (musician) (b. 1988), electronic musician
 Ellison Pogo (1947–2013), Archbishop of Melanesia
 Mr. Pogo (Tetsuo Sekigawa, 1951–2017), Japanese professional wrestler, used the gimmick from 1978 to his death
 Hideki Hosaka (Mr. Pogo (II), born 1971), Japanese professional wrestler, briefly adopted the gimmick in 2017
 Shadow WX (Mr. Pogo (III) or Satoru Shiga, born 1969), Japanese professional wrestler; adopted the gimmick in 2021
 Pogo the Clown or John Wayne Gacy (1942–1994), American serial killer
 Madonna Wayne Gacy (born 1964), nicknamed Pogo

Places
 Pogo, Alabama, US
 Pogo, Ivory Coast
 Pogo, Mali
 Pogo, Ferkessédougou, Ivory Coast
 POGO tracking station, Greenland, a remote station located near Thule Air Base, operated by the U.S. Space Force

Technology
 Bell Pogo, a two-person rocket-powered platform
 Convair XFY Pogo, an experimental aircraft
 Pogo oscillation, a potentially dangerous rocket engine behavior
 PoGo, a mobile printer by Polaroid Corporation
 Pogo pin, a device used in electronics to connect two printed circuit boards

Computing
 AT&T Pogo, a web browser
 Pogo Mobile and nVoy, a handheld networked device launched in 2000
 Profile-guided optimization (PGO, sometimes pronounced pogo), in computer programming

Other uses
 Pogo (food), also known as a corn dog
 Pogo (gorilla), a female gorilla at the San Francisco Zoo, US

See also
 
 Pogopalooza, the annual gathering and competition of stunt pogoers
 Bogo (disambiguation)
 PGO (disambiguation)
 Pogoriki, a character in the American children's television series GoGoRiki